The canoeing, kayaking, and traditional boat racing competitions at the 2019 Southeast Asian Games in Philippines was held at the Malawaan Park, Olongapo.

Medal table

Medalists

Canoeing and kayaking

Traditional boat racing

References

External links
 

2019 Southeast Asian Games events